The Maxims of Islamic Law were established after representatives of all schools of thought regarding Muslim Jurisprudence came together to reach a consensus.
Maxims refer to a body of abstract rules that were produced after a detailed study of the fiqh. They’re theoretical guidelines corresponding to different areas of fiqh, which may be dealing with anything from evidence to matrimonial law. The fiqh is Islamic jurisprudence, through the human interpretation of Islamic law.

The five Normative Maxims of Islamic law
 : Acts are judged by the intention behind them
 : Harm must be eliminated 
 : Certainty is not overruled by doubt
 : Cultural usage shall have the weight of law
 : Hardship begets facility

References 

Islamic jurisprudence